Westmar University was a private four-year liberal arts college in Le Mars, Iowa, United States.  It permanently closed on November 21, 1997.

Westmar University was founded in 1887 as the Northwestern Normal School and Business College by Jacob Wernli, the Plymouth County Superintendent of Schools.  Wernli severed his association with the school in 1891. In 1892 it was taken over by the Le Mars Normal Association, an organization of local businessmen who saw value in having a college in the town, and renamed as Le Mars Normal School.  It emphasized the training of teachers for public schools. In 1900, ownership of the college was transferred to the United Evangelical Church, renaming it Western Union College. During World War II, Western Union College trained Naval Air Cadets in primary flight, at first with three bi-planes and later in Piper Cub aircraft.

In 1948, the college was renamed as Westmar College.  In 1954, Westmar merged with York College of Nebraska, making it the only college west of the Mississippi River affiliated with the Evangelical United Brethren Church, the successor institution to the United Evangelical Church. As such, it attracted students from a wide geographical area and expanded to an enrollment of more than 1,000 students. It lost this distinction when the Evangelical United Brethren Church merged with The Methodist Church to form the United Methodist Church in 1968. Given other social changes in those years, Westmar found it increasingly difficult to attract students and began to accumulate debt.

In March 1990, Westmar merged with Teikyo University to form Teikyo-Westmar University.  Teikyo agreed to send 500 Japanese students to the Iowa campus, at a cost of $15,000 each, and to give an additional $4 million for debt reduction.  The next few years were tumultuous ones for the college.

The United Methodist Church severed its ties with the college two months after the merger with Teikyo. In 1994, the school was threatened with revocation of its accreditation by the North Central Association of Colleges and Schools; it was placed on a two-year probation in August of that year. (The probation was renewed in 1996.)  In 1995, Robert Driscoll, a private investor from California, purchased the college from Teikyo University. With the addition of graduate classes, he renamed it Westmar University.  Less than a year later, the city of Le Mars extended a $40,000 loan to the school to keep it afloat, and in 1996 it bought the school outright.

On October 9, 1997, Westmar University announced that, barring a merger with another college, the college would close on November 21.  The final classes 
were held on that date, and on November 22, following its last commencement, Westmar officially closed.

Notable alumni
 Ardie Davis (Ph.B.), Barbeque Hall of Fame member, author of eleven books.
 Rueben Philip Job (B.A., 1954), Bishop of the United Methodist Church .
 Dan Johnston, Iowa lawyer and state legislator.
 Donald Paulin went to Westmar for three years, Iowa businessman and state legislator.
 Frederick Messmore, Justice of the Nebraska Supreme Court.
 Paul Munyon, (B.A., 1966), Prof. Emeritus of Economics, Grinnell College.
 Gloria Shillingford (B.A.), member of the House of Assembly of Dominica.
 Phyllis Thede, politician, state legislator of Iowa since 2009.

References

"Westmar Problems", Sioux City Journal, 10 October 1997

External links
 Unofficial Westmar College Home Page

 
Universities and colleges affiliated with the United Methodist Church
Buildings and structures in Plymouth County, Iowa
Educational institutions established in 1887
Educational institutions disestablished in 1997
1887 establishments in Iowa
1997 disestablishments in Iowa
Defunct private universities and colleges in Iowa